John Martin "Hinkey" Harrison (January 30, 1875 – September 19, 1952) was an American football coach and player. He served as the head football coach at the University of Minnesota in 1899 and North Dakota Agricultural College—now known as North Dakota State University–from 1900 to 1901, compiling a career college football coaching record of 21–4–3.

Head coaching record

References

1875 births
1952 deaths
19th-century players of American football
American football ends
Minnesota Golden Gophers football coaches
Minnesota Golden Gophers football players
North Dakota State Bison football coaches
University of Minnesota Law School alumni
Players of American football from Minnesota